Strictly Breaks is the name of a series of compilation records of songs that are widely admired as break beats. The first volume was released in 1997. Some of the songs featured contain "open breaks" which are solo drum passages which enable DJs to easily transition into them, as well as attractive to producers who loop or rearrange them to create new compositions. Following in the tradition of the Ultimate Breaks and Beats series, the Strictly Breaks records contain an eclectic range of musical styles: mainly funk and jazz, but also including soul, rock, disco and pop. Some of the offerings are well-known (the Psycho theme by Bernard Hermann) but most are relatively obscure tracks treasured by music connoisseurs and DJs. The common, but hard to define thread in all of these songs is that they are "funky". Many of the songs in the Strictly Breaks series have been sampled into new musical compositions, mainly by hip hop producers.

Complete track listings
 Strictly Breaks Volume 1
 "The Long Wait" – Hawaii Five-O Soundtrack
 "You Can't Turn Me Away" – Sylvia Striplin from Give Me Your Love (1981)
 "The Smile" – David Axelrod from Song of Innocence (1968)
 "Rain Dance" – Jeff Lorber
 "Morning" – Cal Tjader from Soul Burst (1966)
 "Summer In The City" – Quincy Jones
 "Garden Of Peace" – Lonnie Liston Smith from Dreams of Tomorrow (1983)
 "I'm Afraid The Masquerade Is Over" – David Porter
 "Mask" – Shelly Manne
 "Get Out My Life Woman" – Joe Williams
 "In The Mood" – Tyrone Davis
 "Drums Of Death" – Bonus Beat
 Strictly Breaks Volume 2
 "Summer Breeze" – The Main Ingredient
 "Adventures In The Land Of Music" – Dynasty
 "My Jamaican Guy" – Grace Jones
 "Enchanted Lady" – Milt Jackson
 "Free Soul" – John Klemmer
 "Unwind Yourself" – Marva Whitney
 "Quinn the Eskimo (The Mighty Quinn)" – Ramsey Lewis
 "EVA" – Jean Jacques Perrey
 "Fun" – Brick
 "Funky Worm" – Ohio Players
 "Night Love" – Jeff Lorber
 "Searching" – Roy Ayers
 Strictly Breaks Volume 3
 "Sweet Green Fields" – Seals & Crofts
 "I Did It For Love" – Love Unlimited Orchestra
 "I Put A Spell On You" – Screamin' Jay Hawkins
 "Killers Lullaby" – Barry White
 "I Hear Music In The Streets" – Unlimited Touch
 "Just Kissed My Baby" – The Meters
 "Black Cow" – Steely Dan
 "Hollywood Swinging" – Kool & The Gang
 "She's A Bad Mama Jama" – Carl Carlton
 "I'm Coming Out" – Diana Ross
 "The Body Rock" – The Treacherous Three
 "I'll Never Grow Old – The Charmells
 "I Want 2 Do Something Freaky 2 U" – Leon Haywood
 "Little Green Apples" – Monk Higgins
 Strictly Breaks Volume 4
 Bob James – "Shamboozie"
 Labi Siffre – "I Got The Blues"
 Buddy Baker – "Sign Song"
 Extra T's – "E.T. Boogie"
 Les McCann – "Vallarta"
 Ann Peebles – "I Can't Stand The Rain"
 Rhythm – "The World Is A Place"
 Zulema – "American Fruit, African Roots"
 Delfonics – "Ready Or Not"
 Ahmad Jamal – "Pastures"
 Ohio Players – "Little Lady Maria"
 Curtis Mayfield – "Tripping Out"
 Eddie Harris – "Lovely Is Today"
 Jack Bruce – "Born To Be Blue"
 Lalo Schifrin – "Danube Incident"
 Brother Jack McDuff – "Strolling"
 Strictly Breaks Volume 5
 Curtis Mayfield – "Right On For The Darkness"
 Cecil Holmes – "Call Me, Come Back Home"
 Al Green – "Love and Happiness"
 Joe Simon – "Drowning in the Sea of Love"
 B.T. Express – "Everything Good To You"
 Willie Mitchell – "Groovin'"
 Nona Hendryx – "Transformation"
 Bill Conti – "Going The Distance"
 George Duke – "Reach For It"
 Bobby Caldwell – "My Flame"
 Cal Tjader – "Django"
 Stevie Wonder – "Too High"
 Larry Young – "Turn Off The Lights"
 Chocolate Milk – "Action Speaks Louder Than Words"
 Strictly Breaks Volume 6
 "A Little Bit Of Love" – Brenda Russell
 "Light My Fire" – Tammi Lynn
 "New Beginning" – Dexter Wansel
 "Moses Theme" – Thom Bell
 "On Your Face" – Earth, Wind & Fire
 "Viellir" – Jacques Brel
 "Rolling Stone" – The Troggs
 "Once In A Lifetime" – Talking Heads
 "I've Got Nothing To Lose But The Blues" – Gwen McCrae
 "Free And Easy" – The Dells
 "I'm Your Mechanicle Man" – Jerry Butler
 "There Was A Time" – The Deefelice Trio
 "Black Cream" – Harold Wheeler
 Strictly Breaks Volume 7
 "Don't Ask Me" – Ramon Morris
 "Midnight Groove" – Love Unlimited Orchestra
 "Weak At The Knees" – Steve Arrington
 "Don't Let It Go To Your Head" – Jean Carn
 "Darling, Darling Baby" – Steve Kahn
 "Life Is Just A Moment Pt. 2" – Roy Ayers
 "It's The Hard Knock Life" – Annie Soundtrack
 "Somethings Got To Give" – Afro-Cuban Band
 "Come In Out Of The Rain" – Parliament
 "It's Time To Break Down" – The Supremes
 "Under The Influence Of Love" – Love Unlimited Orchestra
 "My Hero Is A Gun" – Diana Ross
 Strictly Breaks Volume 8
 "Hi-Jack" – Enoch Light
 "Pigs Go Home" – Ronald Stein
 "I Wanna Stay" – Barry White
 "Blow Your Head (Undubbed Version)" – Fred Wesley and The J.B.'s
 "The Fox" – Don Randi
 "The Morning Song" – Les McCann
 "Vibrations" – Buster Williams
 "The Rub" – George & Gwen McCrae
 "Psycho" – Bernard Herrmann
 "Love Till Tomorrow" – Pablo Today
 "Down Home Girl" – The Coasters
 "Big Bad John" – Big John Hamilton
 Strictly Breaks Volume 9
 "Cher Chez La Femme (Se Si Bon)" – Dr. Buzzard's Original Savannah Band
 "Love For the Sake of Love" – Claudia Barry
 "The Edge" – David McCullan
 "Esto Es El Guaganco" – Jose Cheo Feliciano
 "Notorious" – J. Taylor
 "Chicago" – G. Nash
 "My Song" – Al Wilson
 "Anything" – Lionel Bart
 "N.T." – Kool & the Gang
 "Monoaurail" – The J.B.'s
 "Polarizer" – Joe Thomas
 "Nadia's Theme" – Barry De Vorzon
 Strictly Breaks Volume 10
 "Haboglabotribin" – Bernard Wright
 "'Cause I Need It" – Dorothy Ashby 
 "Right Place, Wrong Time" – Dr. John
 "How to Dance" – The Fatback Band
 "The Stripper" – Michael Quatro
 "Under the Cherry Moon" – Prince
 "I Don't Wanna Go" – Paul Butterfield
 "I Don't Know What It Is, But It Sure Is Funky" – Ripple
 "Crab Apple" – Idris Muhammad
 "Down Home Up's" – John Kasandra
 "You're Gettin' a Little Too Smart" – The Detroit Emeralds
 "Dominoes" – Donald Byrd
 Strictly Breaks Volume 11
 "Oh, Calcutta" – The Meters
 "Thunder Kiss" – Toshiyuki Honda
 "Rubberband" – The Trammps
 "Naked Truth" – Best of Both Worlds
 "Sunny" – Boney M.
 "Diamonds Are Forever" – Franck Pourcel
 "Mandrake" – Gong
 "No Money Down" – Jerry Butler
 "Tearaway" – John Scott
 "Let Me Prove My Love For You" – Main Ingredient
 "Movement IV (Encounter" – Mandrill
 "Diamonds Are Forever" – Shirley Brown
 "Crime of the Century" – Supertramp
 "Lovin' You" – Johnny "Guitar" Watson

Compilation album series
Dance music compilation albums
Electronic compilation albums
Funk compilation albums